Garfield and Friends is an American animated television series based on the comic strip Garfield by Jim Davis. The show aired on CBS as part of its Saturday morning children's lineup from September 17, 1988, to December 10, 1994.

The show features animated story lines adapted from the comic strip Garfield and Davis's other comic strip U.S. Acres. Mark Evanier was the show's head writer. Lorenzo Music provided the voice of Garfield the cat, the strip's title character, as he had done since Here Comes Garfield in 1982. Other voices present on the show included Thom Huge as Jon Arbuckle, Garfield's human owner, and Gregg Berger as Odie the dog. Berger and Huge also respectively voiced Orson Pig and Roy Rooster in the U.S. Acres segments. 121 episodes were made, each consisting of two Garfield segments and one U.S. Acres segment. All episodes have been released in the U.S. on five DVD sets by 20th Century Fox Home Entertainment.

Content

Garfield is an American comic strip created by Jim Davis and started in 1978. The comic strip was first adapted into animated form in 1980 for the special The Fantastic Funnies, but reached a wider audience in 1982 with the television movie Here Comes Garfield on CBS. Garfield was adapted into eleven more television movies for the network, ending with Garfield Gets a Life in 1991. Garfield and Friends was also made for CBS, and debuted on the network in 1988. The network first announced in April 1988 that the show would be joining the network's Saturday morning cartoon lineup alongside The Adventures of Raggedy Ann and Andy and Superman.

Each episode of Garfield and Friends typically consists of two segments adapted from Garfield and one adapted from U.S. Acres, a comic strip also created by Davis which began in 1986. These segments featured original story lines written using the characters from each strip, although both segments featured original characters not present in the source material as well. Nearly every episode of the show was written or co-written by Mark Evanier.

Characters

The segments adapted from Garfield feature the same primary characters as the comic strip. The title character, Garfield (voiced by Lorenzo Music), is a greedy and laid-back orange tabby cat. His owner is a human named Jon Arbuckle (voiced by Thom Huge), whose story lines include his failed attempts to date women and his frustrations of dealing with Garfield's mischief. Jon is also the owner of Odie (voiced by Gregg Berger), a yellow dog who is often the subject of Garfield's pranks. Other human characters in the Garfield and Friends segments include Dr. Liz Wilson (voiced by Julie Payne), who is Garfield's veterinarian; Herman Post (voiced by Gregg Berger), who is Jon's mailman; and Binky the Clown (voiced by Thom Huge), the star of his own television show within the series. Non-human characters include Nermal (voiced by Desirée Goyette), a young kitten who often visits Garfield to antagonize him; the Buddy Bears (voiced by Howard Morris, Gregg Berger, and Thom Huge), three bears who are also the star of their own television show; Penelope Pussycat (voiced by Victoria Jackson), Garfield’s love interest (replacing Arlene) who lives in an Italian restaurant; and Floyd (voiced by Gregg Berger), a mouse Garfield interacts with regularly who wishes to have a bigger role on the show.

The second comic strip adapted for the series, U.S. Acres, is set on a farm with various animals. The lead character is Orson (voiced by Gregg Berger), an imaginative pig who enjoys reading books. Accompanying him in these segments are Roy (voiced by Thom Huge), a loud-mouthed rooster who enjoys pranking the others, Wade (voiced by Howard Morris), a cowardly duck; Bo (voiced by Frank Welker) and Lanolin (voiced by Julie Payne), a pair of sheep who are brother and sister; and Booker and Sheldon (both voiced by Frank Welker), a pair of juvenile chickens. Orson's brothers Mort, Gort, and Wart (respectively voiced by Frank Welker, Thom Huge, and Howard Morris) regularly serve as antagonists within the U.S. Acres segments.

Production and cancellation
Although the series was a success in the ratings at the time, it had become expensive to make and the Saturday morning cartoon format was in decline by the mid-1990s. Additionally, CBS as a whole was a distant third behind NBC and ABC for much of the series' run, and was in the middle of its cost-cutting by Laurence Tisch that resulted in CBS losing broadcasting rights to the National Football League for four years starting in 1994 and subsequently losing many longtime affiliates to Fox, which had outbid CBS for its NFL package. As a result, CBS proposed renewing the show for another season, albeit with significant budget cuts. Since the show did well in syndication, producers ended the series in 1994 with its seventh season.

Episodes

Garfield and Friends consists of 121 episodes in total, airing in seven seasons.

Reception and legacy
At the time of the series' release, critical reviews on it were generally negative. Charles Solomon of The Los Angeles Times wrote in 1988, "Garfield has lost all his feline qualities and become a crabby little man in a cat suit. With more than 3,500 Garfield products on the market, does anyone really need to see more of the character? Gene Seymour of The Pittsburgh Press rated the show "D-", saying that the show "tries too hard to be hip" and "the jokes are flat."

The quality of Garfield and Friends when compared with other 1980s animated television series is considered by animation historian Jerry Beck to "foreshadow the higher quality animation boom coming in the next decade.” Hal Erickson says that "Garfield and Friends rapidly became the hub around which the rest of CBS' morning lineup was built," and it "seemed to get better with each passing season."

Home media

Region 1
In response to the financial success of Garfield: The Movie, 20th Century Fox Home Entertainment released all seven seasons of Garfield and Friends to Region 1 DVD in five volume box sets, with each set having 24-25 episodes on three discs. Each set features an image of Garfield with a U.S. Acres character. These DVD sets show the original telecast versions, rather than the edited versions once seen in syndication and on cable networks. As of October 2013, these releases have been discontinued and are out of print.

On May 25, 2016, 9 Story Media Group announced that they had acquired worldwide distribution rights to Garfield and Friends and planned to remaster the series in HD and re-release it on DVD. On January 15, 2019, 9 Story Media Group (distributed by Public Media Distribution through its SkipRope label) released a best-of set entitled 20 Garfield Stories on DVD in Region 1. They have subsequently begun re-releasing the series on DVD in Region 1 in complete season sets, season 1 was released on July 16, 2019, season 2 was released on November 5, 2019, and season 3 was released on October 27, 2020. A 6-disc set titled The Grumpy Cat Collection containing the first three remastered seasons, was released on June 15, 2021.

Syndication history
Garfield and Friends has been syndicated on television around the world, beginning in the late 1980s and remaining on air in present day. In Latin America, it played on Cartoon Network from 1993 to 2005, on Boomerang from 2005 to 2008, on Warner Channel from 1998 to 2002, and on Tooncast from 2008 to 2016. Currently, all four of these networks have lost the rights to the show. Televisa's Canal 5 also played the show for many years, from the mid-1990s to early 2000s.

In Australia, Garfield and Friends began syndication on Network Ten from 1992 to 1999. It also aired on cable television on Nickelodeon for several years. Most recently it played on FOX8 from 2004 to 2006. But it came back and it was played on Eleven (Australian TV channel) from 2011 to 2014.

The United Kingdom and the United States remain the highest syndicators of the show. In the UK, it appeared on CITV from 1989 through 2002 (10 minutes per episode), on Sky1 from 1998 to 2002 (also 10 minutes per episode), and on Boomerang from 2003 to 2006 with Season 1 and 2 only. It also appeared on The Children's Channel in reruns. It is unknown if it will ever return to the UK.

In Ireland, Garfield and Friends aired on RTÉ TWO Monday to Friday at 6pm (followed by Home and Away); it replaced RTÉ teen magazine programme Jo Maxi and was eventually replaced by The Simpsons.

In the United States, the series appeared in syndication on local stations, distributed by The Program Exchange, between 1993 and 2006 (with broadcast stations running it into 2001). Only 73 of the 121 episodes were acquired by The Program Exchange. This was due to the producers selling syndication rights when the show was still on air and CBS wanting to keep the rights for certain episodes. Since the 73-episode syndication package performed well enough on stations already airing the show, acquiring the later episodes were deemed unnecessary. This syndication package also aired on TBS, TNT, and Cartoon Network from 1995 to 1997, and Nickelodeon from 1997 to 2000. In 2001, it appeared on Fox Family Channel (and later, ABC Family) until 2003. Toon Disney aired it from 2003 to 2005. Boomerang carried it from 2006 to 2007, and again from 2019 to 2021. As of November 2018, Boomerang's subscription video on demand site offers over 50 episodes of the series. Starz Encore also aired it on its family channel. The series later gained its own 24/7 Pluto TV channel on September 7, 2021.

Garfield and Friends aired in Canada on the cable TV channel YTV from 1993 to 2001. The show was broadcast on Teletoon's 24-hour classic-animation network, Teletoon Retro, until the channel's shutdown on September 1, 2015.

Garfield and Friends was also broadcast in New Zealand in the late 1980s and early 1990s. It aired on TV3 as part of a wrapper programme for children called The Early Bird Show by airing on weekday mornings and then on Saturday mornings when the show was shifted to only airing on weekend mornings. Garfield and Friends aired on that show up until its cancellation in 1992.

The series was played on television in Singapore first airing on Channel 5 from 1990 to 1992 and later on Kids Central from 2004 to 2005.

Garfield and Friends aired in South Africa on M-Net as part of their children's block K-T.V. and was frequently shown numerous times. Garfield and Friends later aired on e.tv in the late 2000s.

Garfield and Friends was originally syndicated by The Program Exchange between 1993 and 2006. Only 73 episodes out of the 121 episodes were acquired by The Program Exchange. This was due to the producers selling syndication rights when the show was still on air and CBS wanting to keep the rights for certain episodes. Since the 73-episode syndication package performed well enough on stations already airing the show, acquiring the later episodes were deemed unnecessary.

Streaming
In 2012, the series became available to purchase on the iTunes Store, Amazon Prime Video, and Google TV, along with the series being available to stream on Netflix and Hulu. The series is no longer available on any of the services in the United States as of 2018.

GarfieldEats had the show available as part of its app.

Seasons 1 and 2 of the show have also been made available for free on YouTube.

Remastered
On October 25, 2018, it was announced that the first 30 episodes of Garfield and Friends will be made available to stream on Boomerang, in remastered form, starting on November 1, 2018. All episodes from the first three remastered seasons are currently available to stream on Boomerang, while the remaining remastered seasons are available to stream on Tubi and Pluto TV.

The Garfield Show

A new CGI series premiered in 2009. Many crew members on Garfield and Friends also worked on this series, such as executive producer/creator Jim Davis and co-writer/voice director Mark Evanier.

Frank Welker replaced Lorenzo Music as the voice of Garfield due to Music's death in 2001, while Wally Wingert replaced Thom Huge as the voice of Jon Arbuckle due to Huge's retirement in the same year. Other familiar voice actors have also appeared, some of them reprising their roles (such as Gregg Berger as Odie and Herman Post).

The series does not include the U.S. Acres series and characters, as well as other main characters from Garfield and Friends. In one episode, Binky the Clown is mentioned, to which Garfield then replies, "My contract says he's not allowed to be in this series."

See also
 Heathcliff - An earlier animated series based on fellow comic strip feline Heathcliff.

References

External links

 
 
 
 

Garfield
1988 American television series debuts
1994 American television series endings
1980s American animated television series
1990s American animated television series
1980s American children's comedy television series
1990s American children's comedy television series
American children's animated comedy television series
CBS original programming
English-language television shows
Television series by Film Roman
Television shows based on comic strips
Animated television series about cats
Animated television series about dogs
Television series by 9 Story Media Group
Television shows set in Indiana
Self-reflexive television